Ilafy is a town and commune in Madagascar. It belongs to the district of Ambatondrazaka, which is a part of Alaotra-Mangoro Region. The population of the commune was estimated to be approximately 13,000 in 2001 commune census.

Primary and junior level secondary education are available in town. The majority 96% of the population of the commune are farmers, while an additional 1% receives their livelihood from raising livestock. The most important crop is rice, while other important products are cassava, sweet potatoes and bambara groundnut.  Industry and services provide employment for 0.5% and 1.5% of the population, respectively. Additionally fishing employs 1% of the population.

Ilafy is of historical and cultural significance, widely considered one of the twelve sacred hills of Imerina.

References and notes 

Populated places in Alaotra-Mangoro